The Freedom to Rock Tour was a concert tour by the American rock band Kiss. The tour hit secondary markets and smaller cities in 2016. The tour started on July 4 in Tucson, Arizona, marking a return to the city for the first time since 2000. The tour was also the first full scale North American tour for the band since 2014.

In the tour program for the band's final tour, Stanley reflected on the tour:

History 
At the Rockford, Illinois show, Cheap Trick's Rick Nielsen joined the band onstage to play "Rock and Roll All Nite".

Reception 
Emerson Malone of the Daily Emerald described the Eugene, Oregon show as "Musically, the band still sounds incredible and the set came with numerous things to love: Thayer's inky, sludgy guitar in "Calling Dr. Love" and "Strutter," Singer's drum fills in "Cold Gin," and Singer taking the reins on vocals during the lighter-sparking ballad "Beth." 

Lacey Paige, of Exclaim, praised the nostalgic aspect of a Kiss concert, as "For younger audiences, experiencing a live Kiss concert for the first time is like stepping into a time machine and going back to the late 1970s, when the New York-based glam-shock-rockers' career soared to the pinnacle of rock'n'roll prestige. A Kiss show perfectly encapsulates the zeitgeist of that era, giving older generations of fans a chance to relive and relish the essence of their youth." 

Mike Baltierra, of Seattle Music Insider, did a positive review of the Kennewick, Washington concert: "Stanley had the crowd eating out of the palm of his hand. While Simmons lurked over the crowd, Thayer ripped out riff after riff, and Singer pounded on the drums".

Setlist
This is the setlist from the first show of the tour, and may not represent the majority of the tour:
"Detroit Rock City"
"Deuce"
"Shout It Out Loud"
"Do You Love Me?"
"I Love It Loud"
"Flaming Youth"
"God of Thunder" (Gene Solo, Spits Blood and Flies)
"Psycho Circus"
"Shock Me" (Tommy Guitar Solo)
"Cold Gin"
"Lick It Up"
"War Machine"
"Love Gun"
"Black Diamond"

Encore
"Beth"
"The Star-Spangled Banner" (John Stafford Smith cover)
"Rock and Roll All Nite"

Notes
"Flaming Youth" not played in Tucson
"Strutter" only played in Boise, Eugene and Kennewick
"100,000 Years" only played in Tucson, Boise, Eugene and Kennewick
"I Was Made for Lovin' You" only played in Edmonton
"O Canada" only played in Edmonton and Calgary
"God of Thunder" not played in Tucson, Boise, Eugene and Kennewick
"Creatures of the Night" was played in Grand Rapids but otherwise replaced by "Do You Love Me?"

Tour dates

Box office score data

Gross

The tour grossed $15.4 million, with 233,262 tickets sold in 40 shows.

Personnel

Kiss
Paul Stanley – vocals, rhythm guitar
Gene Simmons – vocals, bass
Tommy Thayer – lead guitar, vocals
Eric Singer – drums, vocals

Guest appearances
Rick Nielsen – guest guitarist (August 20, 2016)

References

External links

 KissOnline Tour

2016 concert tours
Kiss (band) concert tours